The Lone Ranger is the first solo album by British singer Suggs, singer in second wave ska band Madness. It was released in 1995 (see 1995 in music). The album peaked at No. 14 in the UK charts. "Cecilia", a cover of the Simon and Garfunkel song, reached No. 4 on the UK charts. The song "4 am" was later re-recorded and appeared on the 1999 Madness album Wonderful.

The Lone Ranger was reissued in 2016 by Cherry Red Records as a two-CD deluxe edition.

Background
After the Madness reunion concert in 1992, which yielded the album Madstock!, Suggs became involved in working on his first solo album. He had written a few songs, including "Alcohol" and "Fortune Fish". In 1994, Rob Dickins arranged for Suggs to work with producers Sly and Robbie on some songs. Dickins suggested "I'm Only Sleeping" as a track, while Sly and Robbie proposed "Cecilia" as one of the songs to work on. Other songs produced by Sly and Robbie are "Camden Town", "Haunted" and "Off on Holiday", and they also helped to produce "The Tune", a song written by Mike Barson. After the sessions with Sly and Robbie ended, other songs were recorded with other producers.

Suggs collaborated with Barson to write and produce a number of song, including "Camden Town", "4 am", which is a tribute to The Kinks, and "She's Gone".  The songs, including "Green Eyes", were co-produced with engineer Kevin Petrie, who also helped with  "Alcohol" and "Fortune Fish".

After the second Madstock concert, Madstock II, Suggs announced that he would pursue a solo career in August 1994, and made his first appearance as a solo artist in November on Danny Baker After All, performing "I'm Only Sleeping" and Morrissey's "Suedehead". His debut album The Lone Ranger was released in 1995.

Reception

Evan Cater, writing for Allmusic, wrote, "The Lone Ranger has the feel of an amateur demo, populated primarily by drum machines and synthesizers ... But despite the weakness of the production, Suggs manages credible covers of the Beatles' "I'm Only Sleeping" and Simon and Garfunkel's "Cecilia." Cater was not impressed with Suggs' songwriting talent on the songs he wrote by himself, but felt that he fared better on the ones he co-wrote with Mike Barson, "who appears to have a stronger sense of melody."

Record Collector'''s Mark Elliott wrote, "this charming, 60s-influenced, 11-song set hits the sweet spot where an experimental edge packs an impressive commercial punch and everyone emerges with their dignity intact." Trouser Press'' described the album as delivering "much the same ska pop mixture and music hall jollity as [Madness], but with more weight to the production."

Track listing
Adapted from the album's liner notes.

2016 reissue
Disc one
The first disc contains the eleven tracks from the original album plus eight bonus tracks.

Disc two

Personnel
Credits adapted from the album's liner notes.

Although no musicians are credited on the album, the following are thanked:
Jah Wobble
Phil Spalding
Rico Rodriguez
Jazz Jamaica
John Themis
Sly and Robbie
Louchie Lou and Michie One (on "Cecilia") 
Ben Barson (on "Alcohol") 
Anne Dudley – string arrangement on "She's Gone"

Technical
Suggs – production (3, 4, 9-11), booklet photography
Mike Barson – production (3, 4, 9-11)
Sly and Robbie – production (1, 2, 6-8), additional production (5), mixing (1, 2, 5-8)
TommyD – production (5)
Garry Hughes – additional production (2, 6-8) 
Kevin Petrie – additional production, engineer (3, 4, 9-11)
Paul Taylor – additional production, mixing (4, 9)
Pete Craigie – additional production, mixing (4, 9)
Gregg Jackman – mixing (3, 10, 11)
Trevor Key – booklet cover photography
Ben Kelly – art direction (from an original idea by Marcel Duchamp)
Assorted Images – artwork
Jill Furmanovsky – booklet photography
Eugene Adebari – booklet photography
Gavin Evans – booklet photography
Rob Dickins – executive producer

2016 reissue bonus tracks
Louchie Lou and Michie One – vocals (17, 19)
Suggs – production (12, 13, 15, 16)
Mike Barson – production (12-16)
Sly and Robbie – production (17)
Garry Hughes – additional production (17)
The Rapino Brothers – production (19) 
Bobby Dee – production (19)
Gregg Jackman – engineering, mixing (19)
Collin "Bulby" York – remix (disc two: 1, 2)
Pepperoni – remix (disc two: 8, 9)

Charts

References

Suggs (singer) albums
1995 debut albums
Albums produced by Sly and Robbie
Warner Records albums